Amesoeurs was a French post-punk/post-black metal band. A side project of Neige of Alcest, the group was formed with musicians Audrey Sylvain and Fursy Teyssier in the summer of 2004. Their goal was to create music that "reflects the dark side of the industrial era and modern civilization".

Teyssier initially left the band shortly after its creation, but returned in 2008, while Winterhalter, who would go on to join both Alcest and Les Discrets, joined in 2007. The band disbanded in 2009.

History

Shortly after Amesoeurs's formation a few songs were written and the band performed a gig. Soon after, Fursy Teyssier decided to leave the band to go back to his studies. In April 2005, a first 3 track EP entitled Ruines Humaines was self-recorded. Neige was leaving the black metal band Mortifera at the time and he used two tracks ("Bonheur Amputé" and "Ruines Humaines") he had originally composed for Mortifera for Amesoeurs's EP. The EP was finally released through Northern Silence Productions from Germany in 2006.

In 2007 Fursy joined the band again and drummer Winterhalter (drummer in Peste Noire between 2006 and 2008) was added to the mix for the full-length album Amesoeurs, released in March 2009 through the Italian label Code 666 records. The first album was recorded during winter 2008-2009 in the Klangschmiede Studio E with Markus Stock from Empyrium, and it is described by the band as "a kaleidoscopic soundtrack for the modern era". Pitchfork gave the album a 7, calling it a "journal of triumph and heartbreak" and "a fervid last gasp of genre-melding creativity". Allmusic writer Ned Raggett gave it a 3-star rating, stating "the most notable thing about Amesoeurs is how little of a unique identity it has in the end. Nearly every notable trend in recent French metal seems to crop up throughout, not to mention other sounds from elsewhere in Europe". Cam Lindsay of Exclaim! stated that the album "furthers black metal's scope while ruffling a few feathers along the way".

After the release of the album, Amesoeurs split up due to what the band described as "internal conflicts and different points of view regarding the band's future". Teyssier and Winterhalter went on to form Les Discrets, while Neige's focus returned to Alcest. Winterhalter became Alcest's drummer in 2009.

Line-up history

 Neige – screamed vocals, guitars, bass, synthesizer (2004–2009), drums (2004–2007)
 Audrey Sylvain – lead vocals, bass, piano (2004–2009)
 Fursy Teyssier – guitars, bass (2004, 2008–2009)
 Winterhalter – drums (2007–2009)

Discography

 Ruines Humaines – EP, 2006
 Valfunde/Amesoeurs – Split album, 2007
 Amesoeurs – Full-length, 2009

References

External links
 Roadrunner Records article

French black metal musical groups
French rock music groups
French post-punk music groups
Shoegazing musical groups
Musical groups established in 2004
Musical groups disestablished in 2009
Post-metal musical groups
Musical quintets
Blackgaze musical groups
Musical groups from Occitania (administrative region)
Profound Lore Records artists